NLSP is an acronym for:
National Land Survey Program
NetWare Link Services Protocol
Next-to-Lightest Supersymmetric Particle
Neighborhood Legal Services Program